Copacol is a Brazilian meat and food processor with its headquarters in Cafelândia, Paraná.

External links
official site

Meat companies of Brazil
Companies based in Paraná (state)
Cooperatives in Brazil